Let's Talk About Sex is a 1998 American dramatic film written, directed, and starring Troy Beyer.

The film was originally rated NC-17 by the MPAA, but was edited for an R-rating. According to Beyer, among other items the MPAA would have required to give the film a lower rating, Beyer was asked to remove a scene where a fully dressed woman licks a peach in demonstration of cunnilingus. Beyer says that the scene was "heartfelt... It wasn't vulgar or demeaning to anyone." Regarding her experience with the MPAA, Beyer said, "I felt violated. I felt raped artistically."

The film has aired numerous times uncut on French television.

References

External links
 

1998 drama films
1998 films
American drama films
American independent films
Films directed by Troy Beyer
1998 directorial debut films
1998 independent films
1990s English-language films
1990s American films